Maha Thamun was a senior minister of the royal court of Hanthawaddy from the 1380s to the 1430s. He also served in the Hanthawaddy armed forces for over 30 years during his kingdom's decades-long war against Ava. He twice led the Hanthawaddy delegation in peace negotiations with Ava in 1391 and in 1430–1431, and secured favorable treaties for his kingdom on both occasions.

Brief

Although he is best known as a longtime senior minister, the first mention of Maha Thamun in the royal chronicles is as a commander of a sentinel battalion of the Hanthawaddy army in the first campaign (1385–1386) of the Forty Years' War.

Peace negotiations of 1391
Maha Thamun made his name in the 1390–1391 campaign. His naval flotilla was instrumental in repulsing the numerically superior Ava invasion fleet, outside the port of Gu-Htut on the Irrawaddy river, in the opening battle of the campaign. His war boats managed to swarm King Swa Saw Ke's royal war boat, and got close enough to capture the gold ornaments from the side of the royal boat itself. The battle proved to be a harbinger of things to come. Over the next few months, Hanthawaddy defenses successfully held off Ava's repeated naval and land-based attacks.

Despite the success, Maha Thamun persuaded the court and the king to sue for peace with Ava. He recommended the king to return Gu-Htut, which Hanthawaddy had occupied since 1390, in exchange for Ava's recognition of Pegu. Razadarit agreed, and appointed Maha Thamun to lead the Hanthawaddy delegation. The negotiations were successful. Faced with yet another embarrassing failure, Swa accepted the face-saving proposal that called for Pegu to return Gu-Htut and prisoners of war, and Ava to recognize Pegu. The treaty ended Swa's war against his southern neighbor, and allowed Pegu to consolidate most of its gains.

Scholarly minister

The success propelled Maha Thamun to become one of the four most senior ministers (amat-gyi, (အမတ်ကြီး)) at the Hanthawaddy court. According to the historian Nai Pan Hla, Maha Thamun was an erudite, scholarly minister, known for advocating ethical conduct by those in position of power; he is said to have coined the Mon proverb that translates to "the children's conduct is a reflection of their parents'; the servants' conduct is a reflection of their lord's".

He remained in the king's inner circle to the early 1400s. After Razadarit renewed the war in 1401, Maha Thamun went to the front with the king as an adviser. In a famous episode, he advised the king to revoke the royal order to execute the troops that had fled the battle of Nawin (which took place on 26 December 1402). He reasoned with a furious king that the responsibility for the fall of the fort laid with the bad planning by the three commanders of the Nawin fort but not with the troops. The king relented. One of the saved was Emundaya, who would become a well known commander in his own right.

His influence appeared to have waned in the following years. In 1408, he was not part of the Hanthawaddy delegation, all of whom were senior commanders, that tried to negotiate a ceasefire. By 1414, he was a subordinate of minister-general Smin Awa Naing. He was part of a group of commanders and advisers led by Awa Naing that was posted at Dala–Twante to defend the key fort. As the chronicle story goes, Dala had been under siege for months in February 1415 when Commander Emundaya managed to slip through Ava lines to inform the starving forces inside the town that help was on the way, and to hold on for a few more weeks. In his last known command as reported in the chronicles, on 13 March 1415, Maha Thamun led an 800-man regiment in the famous battle outside Dala in which Crown Prince Minye Kyawswa of Ava fell in action.

Peace negotiations of 1430–1431
Maha Thamun continued to serve at the Hanthawaddy royal court into the 1430s. In late 1430, King Binnya Ran I sent the old minister to Ava (Inwa) to present his terms to King Thado of Ava. Ran's main demand was for Thado to acknowledge his 1427 annexation of Tharrawaddy and Paungde, which used to be Ava's southernmost districts. Thado was so angry at the demand that he reflexively ordered Maha Thamun to be executed; Chief Minister Yazathingyan had to talk him out of it. The negotiations stalled for three months (until after 27 January 1431) but Thado ultimately agreed to most of Ran's initial terms. Following the negotiations in Ava, Thado and Ran met outside Prome (Pyay); Thado formally ceded Tharrawaddy and Paungde, and sent Princess Soe Min Wimala Dewi, a niece of the late King Minkhaung I of Ava, to Ran, in a marriage of state. The only concession by Ran was to withdraw his support of Toungoo, a rebel vassal state of Ava. Maha Thamun is not mentioned in the chronicles again.

Military service
The following is a list of military campaigns in which Maha Thamun is explicitly mentioned as a commander in the royal chronicles. All of the campaigns were part of the Forty Years' War.

Notes

References

Bibliography
 
 
 
 
 
 

Hanthawaddy dynasty
14th-century births
15th-century deaths